Duji is a district of the city of Huaibei, Anhui Province, China.

Administrative divisions
Nowadays, Duji District is divided to 2 subdistricts and 3 towns.
2 Subdistricts
 Gaoyue
 Kuangshanji

3 Towns
 Duanyuan
 Shuoli
 Shitai

References

Huaibei